Suzy Pierson (1902–1996) was a French film actress. She played lead roles in several silent films of the 1920s.

Selected filmography
 Six and One Half Times Eleven (1927)
 The Three-Sided Mirror (1927)
 André Cornélis (1927)
 Napoleon at Saint Helena (1929)
 77 Rue Chalgrin (1931)
 Let's Touch Wood (1933)
 The Devil in the Bottle (1935)
 The Club of Aristocrats (1937)
 The West (1938)
 Behold Beatrice (1944)

References

Bibliography
 Goble, Alan. The Complete Index to Literary Sources in Film. Walter de Gruyter, 1999.

External links

1902 births
1996 deaths
French film actresses
French silent film actresses
20th-century French actresses
Actresses from Paris